Zheng Tianxiang (September 9, 1914 – October 10, 2013) was a Chinese politician and was the President of the Supreme People's Court of China.

Biography
Zheng was born in Inner Mongolia.  He was educated in Tsinghua University from 1935 to 1937. He was the member of the Central Advisory Commission from 1982 to 1992, and was the President of the Supreme People's Court of China from 1983 to 1988.

References

External links 
 Zheng Tianxiang's profile

1914 births
2013 deaths
20th-century Chinese judges
21st-century Chinese judges
Delegates to the 7th National Congress of the Chinese Communist Party
People from Ulanqab
Presidents of the Supreme People's Court
Tsinghua University alumni